The 1884 Thorndon by-election was a by-election held on 13 May 1884 for the Wellington urban electorate of  during the 8th Parliament.

Wellington businessman William Levin resigned due to ill-health.

He was replaced by Dr Alfred Newman.

One of the losing candidates, Henry Bunny had represented the  electorate from 1865 to 1881. He was widely expected to win.

Thomas Dwan did not impress one reporter at the opening meeting of the campaign, saying that he did not give his usual "political mountebank" speech but a deadly dull one, and that he showed he knew as much about the country districts as a "Hindoo does about skating".

Results
The following table gives the election results:

References

Thorndon 1884
1884 elections in New Zealand
Politics of the Wellington Region
1880s in Wellington